Revolution Saints is an American supergroup conceptualized by Frontiers Records president Serafino Perugino, and formed by Jack Blades of Night Ranger, Damn Yankees and Shaw Blades; Deen Castronovo of Journey and formerly of Wild Dogs, Cacophony, Marty Friedman, Joey Tafolla, The Dead Daisies, Ozzy Osbourne, Bad English and Hardline; and Doug Aldrich of Whitesnake, Dio, Hurricane, Lion, Bad Moon Rising, Burning Rain, House of Lords and The Dead Daisies.

The band collaborates from the beginning with Italian multi-instrumentalist Alessandro Del Vecchio (Silent Force, Hardline, Jorn, Sunstorm, Edge of Forever) as producer, sound engineer, keyboardist and songwriter.

Their self-titled debut album was released on February 24, 2015. Their second album, Light in the Dark, was released on October 13, 2017. The album was ranked #8 on Dr. Music's 2017 "Album of the Year" list.

On November 20, 2019, their third album called Rise was revealed. It was released on January 24, 2020.

In 2022 Blades and Aldrich left the band, and Joel Hoekstra and Jeff Pilson joined. The new lineup released a single, Eagle Flight, on November 28, 2022 and announced a new studio album will be released in the first half of 2023.  Subsequently on January 6, 2023 they released an official music video for the new single, Need Each Other.

Band members
 Deen Castronovo – lead and backing vocals, drums (2014-present)
 Joel Hoekstra - guitars (2022-present)
 Jeff Pilson - bass, vocals (2022-present)

Former members
 Doug Aldrich – guitar, backing vocals (2014-2022)
 Jack Blades – bass guitar, backing and lead vocals (2014-2022)

Touring members
Alessandro Del Vecchio - keyboards, piano, backing vocals (also session member)
Steve Toomey - drums

Discography

Studio albums

References

External links
Interview: Deen Castronovo of Revolution Saints AntiHero Magazine

American supergroups
Frontiers Records artists
American hard rock musical groups